Koen Olthuis (born 1971) is a Dutch architect. He studied architecture and industrial design at Delft University of Technology. Olthuis is founder of the Dutch architectural firm, Waterstudio.NL, which specializes in floating structures to counter concerns of floods and rising sea levels. The firm is currently based in Rijswijk, The Netherlands. 

In 2005, together with Paul Van de Camp, Olthuis co-founded a company that specializes in developing floating structures. 

In 2007, Olthuis was ranked #122 in TIME Magazine's readers' poll of "the most influential people of the year", with a rating of 45 out of 100 possible points. 

In 2010, together with David Keuning, Olthuis authored a book called Float, which discusses construction on water.
Olthuis is currently a member of the Flood Resilience Group UNESCO-IHE. The Flood Resilience Group (UNESCO-IHE / TU Delft) focuses on establishing resilient urban water management. Often partnering with both private and public organisations, the Flood Resilience Group takes a trans-disciplinary approach to enhance resilience of cities to extreme weather events by incorporating urban water system planning, design, and governance.
Koen Olthuis owns patent rights on the method for producing a floating base.

Publications

References

External links 
 Olthuis' Architectural Firm
 Koen Olthuis' patent

1971 births
Living people
Dutch architects
Delft University of Technology alumni
People from Son en Breugel